Mežciems is a neighbourhood of Riga, Latvia. It is located in the eastern part of the city in the Vidzeme Suburb. The name is literally translated from Latvian as forest village. Mežciems is encircled by the Šmerlis and Jugla Forests. Lake Gaiļezers is located at the northern part of the neighbourhood. In its beginnings Mežciems was part of Dreiliņi county characterized by single-family houses.The northern part of Mežciems was included in Riga in 1934. The southern part of Mežciems was included in the city in 1974. Project of the new residential neighbourhood for 15000 people was finished in 1971. Majority of apartment blocks was constructed between 1975 and 1986. Originally the new apartments was granted to artists, medics and factory workers.

Neighbourhoods in Riga